Robert Colin Anderson (born May 5, 1939) is a politician in Manitoba, Canada. Born in Saint Boniface, Manitoba, he was a Progressive Conservative member of the Legislative Assembly of Manitoba from 1977 to 1981.

The son of Robert Anderson and Lillian Marie Kraushar, he was born in St. Boniface, was educated at the University of Manitoba and worked as a farmer.  He served as a councillor in the municipality of Springfield, Manitoba, located east of Winnipeg, from 1968 to 1972. In 1966, he married Jean Edith Shelfontuk.

He was elected to the Manitoba legislature in the provincial election of 1977, defeating incumbent New Democrat Rene Toupin by almost 2,000 votes in the riding of Springfield.  The Tories won this election, and Anderson served as a backbench supporter of Sterling Lyon's government for the next four years.  He lost to NDP candidate Andy Anstett by 470 votes in the 1981 election, and has not sought a return to the legislature since then.

References

1939 births
Living people
People from Saint Boniface, Winnipeg
Politicians from Winnipeg
Progressive Conservative Party of Manitoba MLAs